Rozon is a surname. Notable people with the surname include:

 Gilbert Rozon (born 1954), Canadian businessman
 James Rozon (born 1963), Canadian gymnast
 Tim Rozon (born 1976), Canadian actor